The year 1947 in television involved some significant events.
Below is a list of television-related events during 1947.



Events
January 3 – Proceedings of the U.S. Congress are televised for the first time.
January 22 – The first commercial television station west of the Mississippi River, KTLA, begins operation in Hollywood.
January 29 – RCA company demonstrates an all-electronic color television system using live images, to the US Federal Communications Commission.
January 30 – The FCC rejects CBS' color television system.
February 10-March 11 – BBC television service in the UK is temporarily suspended due to a national fuel crisis.
March 11 – The first successful American children's television series, Movies for Small Fry debuts on the DuMont Network.
July 16 – RCA demonstrates the world's first all-electronic color camera to the Federal Communications Commission. (Only television receivers are present at the demonstration on January 29; the camera is at a remote studio.)
September 30 – The opening game of the World Series is the first World Series game to be telecast. The 1947 World Series is watched by an estimated 3.9 million people (many watching in bars and other public places), becoming television's first mass audience.  
October 5 – The first telecast of a presidential address from the White House. President Truman speaks about the world food crisis. It is preceded by a Jell-O commercial, and features the president discussing his program for food rationing. The address is televised by WTVW-TV (presently WJLA-TV Channel 7 in Washington DC) as part of its inaugural broadcast. It is also simulcast by radio. It was long believed that no copy of this broadcast existed, but segments are preserved on kinescope in the Library of Congress.  (For the record, President Franklin Roosevelt's address broadcast over NBC experimental television W2XBS—now WNBC—at the 1939 New York World's Fair preceded the 1947 Truman broadcast. However, Truman's broadcast is the first from inside the White House.)
October 13 – The puppet show series Junior Jamboree, later known as Kukla, Fran and Ollie, premieres on WBKB in Chicago, Illinois.
November 6 – Meet the Press first appears as a local program in Washington, D.C.
November 8 – Memorial service broadcast from the Cenotaph by the BBC, using tele-recording for the first time.
The first Hollywood movie production for TV, The Public Prosecutor.
There are 250,000 television sets in use in the United States.

Debuts
March 11 – Small Fry Club (1947–1951)
April 3 – Juvenile Jury (1947–1954)
May – The Swift Home Service Club (1947–?)
May 2 – Doorway to Fame (1947–1949)
May 7 – Kraft Television Theater on NBC, the first regularly scheduled drama series on a network (1947–1958)
May 15 – King Cole's Birthday Party (1947–1949)
May 21 – In the Kelvinator Kitchen (1947–1948)
June 16 – The Walter Compton News (1947–1948)
July 8 – Major League Baseball on NBC (1947–2000)
July 25 – Musical Merry-Go-Round (1947–1949)
October 13 – Junior Jamboree (later named Kukla, Fran and Ollie), on WBKB in Chicago (1947–1957)
October 1947 – first telecording by BBC (kinescope), showing black singer Adelaide Hall performing two songs with chorus and her guitar
November 18 – situation comedy Mary Kay and Johnny on Dumont network (1947–1950)
November 19 – Missus Goes a Shopping debuts on CBS, becoming that network's first commercial daytime series.
November 20 – Meet the Press, first network telecast on NBC (1947–present)
November 27 – Charade Quiz (1947–1949)
November – Swing Into Sports (1947–1949)
December 4 – Television Playhouse (1947–1948)
December 8 – Americana (1947–1949)
December 27 – Puppet Television Theater (later called Howdy Doody), a children's television program on NBC (1947–1960)
The Jack Eigen Show (1947–1951)
Café Continental (UK) on the BBC Television Service) (1947–1953)

Television shows

Ending this year

Births
 January 8 – Laurie Walters, actress (Eight is Enough)
 January 17 - Jane Elliot, actress (General Hospital)
 January 19 - Paula Deen, chef, cookbook author, and TV personality
 January 21 - Jill Eikenberry, actress (L.A. Law)
 January 31
Glynn Turman, actor (A Different World, The Wire, House of Lies)
Jonathan Banks, actor
 February 2 – Farrah Fawcett, actress (Charlie's Angels) (died 2009)
 February 3 - Tonea Stewart, actress (In the Heat of the Night)
 February 20 – Peter Strauss, actor
 February 24 – Edward James Olmos, actor (Miami Vice, Battlestar Galactica)
 February 26 – Steve Melnyk, golfer
 February 28 - Stephanie Beacham, actress (Dynasty, The Colbys)
 March 1 – Alan Thicke, actor (Growing Pains) (died 2016)
 March 6 – Rob Reiner, actor (All in the Family), producer and director
 March 7 – Richard Lawson, actor
 March 19 – Glenn Close, actress
 March 24 - Alan Sugar, English television presenter
 March 25 - Elton John, English singer, pianist and composer
 April 2 - Sam Anderson, actor, Perfect Strangers, Angel, Lost
 April 4 
Luke Halpin, actor (Flipper)
Ray Fosse, baseball player (died 2021)
 April 6 – John Ratzenberger, actor (Cheers)
 April 11 - Meshach Taylor, actor (died 2014)
 April 12 
David Letterman, comedian and talk show host (The Late Show)
Dan Lauria, actor
 April 16 - Kareem Abdul-Jabbar, NBA basketball player
 April 18
Dorothy Lyman, actress (Another World, Mama's Family, Generations)
Cindy Pickett, actress (Guiding Light, St. Elsewhere)
James Woods, actor (Holocaust, Shark)
 April 19 - Jeff Maxwell, actor (M*A*S*H)
 April 26 - Boyd Matson, former anchor of National Geographic Explorer
 May 6 - Alan Dale, actor (The Young Doctors, Neighbours)
 May 10 - Marion Ramsey, actress and singer (Cos)
 May 16 - Andrew Lack, television executive
 May 25 - Karen Valentine, actress (Room 222)
 May 29 - Anthony Geary, actor (General Hospital)
 June 3 - Shuki Levy, Israeli-American music composer 
 June 14 - Len Berman, American television sportscaster
 June 20 - Paul Kreppel, actor and director (It's a Living)
 June 21
 Meredith Baxter, actress (Family Ties)
 Michael Gross, actor (Family Ties)
 June 22 
 David Lander, comedic actor (Laverne & Shirley)
 Pete Maravich, NBA basketball player (died 1988)
 June 25 - Jimmie Walker, actor (Good Times)
 June 26 - Carmen Finestra, producer and TV writer
 June 29 - Richard Lewis, comedian and actor (Anything but Love)
 July 1 - Shirley Hemphill, comedian and actress (What's Happening!!) (died 1999)
 July 2 – Larry David, actor, writer and producer (Seinfeld, Curb Your Enthusiasm)
 July 3 – Betty Buckley, actress and singer (Eight is Enough)
 July 5 – Joe Brown, judge
 July 8 - Kim Darby, actress
 July 9 - O.J. Simpson, actor and former NFL football player
 July 20 
Carlos Santana, guitarist
Rose Ann Scamardella, former anchorwoman
 July 22 – Albert Brooks, actor (The Simpsons), comedian and director
 July 23 
Larry Manetti, actor (Magnum, P.I.)
Kaity Tong, American broadcast journalist
 July 27 - Betty Thomas, actress (Hill Street Blues)
 July 28 - Sally Struthers, actress (All in the Family)
 July 30 
Arnold Schwarzenegger, Austrian-born American actor, bodybuilder and 38th governor of California
William Atherton, American actor
 August 8 - Larry Wilcox, actor (CHiPs)
 August 13 - Gretchen Corbett, actress, The Rockford Files
 August 19 - Gerald McRaney, actor (Simon & Simon, Major Dad, Promised Land)
 August 20 - Ray Wise, actor (Twin Peaks)
 August 22 - Cindy Williams, actress (Laverne and Shirley)
 August 28 - Debra Mooney, actress (Everwood)
 September 4 – Jane Curtin, actress and comedian (Saturday Night Live, Kate and Allie, 3rd Rock from the Sun)
 September 6 – Bob Jenkins, announcer (died 2021)
 September 21 - Stephen King, author
 September 27 
Liz Torres, actress (The John Larroquette Show)
Denis Lawson, actor
 October 1 
Stephen Collins, actor (7th Heaven)
Larry Lamb, actor
 October 12 – Chris Wallace, television news anchor
 October 17 – Michael McKean, actor (Laverne & Shirley, Better Call Saul)
 October 18 – Joe Morton, actor
 October 24 – Kevin Kline, actor
 October 26 – Hillary Clinton, politician
 October 29 – Richard Dreyfuss, actor (The Education of Max Bickford)
 October 31 
Deidre Hall, actress (Days of Our Lives)
Ira Joe Fisher, broadcaster
 November 2 - Kate Linder, actress (The Young and the Restless)
 November 3 - Shadoe Stevens, actor
 November 9 - Robert David Hall, actor (CSI: Crime Scene Investigation)
 November 13 - Joe Mantegna, actor (Criminal Minds)
 November 18 - Jameson Parker, actor (Simon & Simon)
 November 24 – Dwight Schultz, actor (The A-Team, Star Trek: The Next Generation, Chowder)
 November 25 – John Larroquette, actor (Night Court)
 December 11 
Terry Turner, producer
Bill Cunningham, talk show host
 December 21 – Kay Robertson, American television personality
 December 23 – Peter Kostis, American golf analyst
 December 29 – Ted Danson, actor (Cheers, Becker, CSI: Crime Scene Investigation)
 December 31 – Tim Matheson, actor (Jonny Quest, The West Wing)

Deaths
February 26 – Kálmán Tihanyi, Hungarian physicist, major contributor to the development of the cathode ray tube, 49

References

External links